Hoi Chun is one of the 29 constituencies in the Sai Kung District.

Created for the 2019 District Council elections, the constituency returns one district councillor to the Sai Kung District Council, with an election every four years.

Hoi Chun loosely covers residential area in southern Tseung Kwan O. It was named by the first Chinese words of The Papillons and The Wings respectively. It has projected population of 18,223.

Councillors represented

Election results

2010s

References

Tseung Kwan O
Constituencies of Hong Kong
Constituencies of Sai Kung District Council
2019 establishments in Hong Kong
Constituencies established in 2019